Gettelfinger is a surname. Notable people with the surname include:

Gerald Andrew Gettelfinger (born 1935), American Roman Catholic bishop
Ron Gettelfinger (born 1944), American trade union leader
Sara Gettelfinger (born  1977), American actress, singer, and dancer